The 2010–11 Persian Gulf Cup (also known as Iran Pro League) was the 28th season of Iran's Football League and tenth as Iran Pro League since its establishment in 2001. Sepahan were the defending champions. The season featured 15 teams from the 2009–10 Persian Gulf Cup and three new teams promoted from the 2009–10 Azadegan League: Shahrdari Tabriz and Naft Tehran both as champions and Sanat Naft. The league started on 26 July 2010 and ended on 20 May 2011. Sepahan won the Pro League title for the third time in their history (total third Iranian title).

Teams

Stadia and locations

Personnel and sponsoring

Managerial changes

Before the start of the season

In season

League table

Positions by round

Results

Clubs season-progress

Statistics

Top goalscorers 

1 Saeed Salarzadeh from Malavan 2 owne goals. 
Last updated: 26 May 2011 Source: IPL Stats

Top Assistants 

Last updated: 25 May 2011 Source: IPL stats

Cards 

Last updated: 25 May 2011Source: IPL stats

Matches played 

Last updated: 25 May 2011Source:  IPL stats

Attendances

Average home attendances

Highest attendances

Notes:Updated to games played on 20 May 2011. Source: iplstats.com

See also 
 2010–11 Azadegan League
 2010–11 Iran Football's 2nd Division
 2010–11 Iran Football's 3rd Division
 2010–11 Hazfi Cup
 Iranian Super Cup
 2010–11 Iranian Futsal Super League

Team season articles 
 2010–11 Persepolis
 2010–11 Foolad

References

External links
 2010–11 Persian Gulf Cup at Soccerway
 2010–11 Persian Gulf Cup at FIFA.com

Iran Pro League seasons
Iran
1